Mark Veldmate (born 7 September 1984) is a Dutch former professional footballer who played as a forward.

Career
He started his career with FC Groningen, but making three Eredivisie appearances for the club. In 2005, he moved to FC Emmen, where he made 72 appearances in the Eerste Divisie, scoring 5 goals. In 2006, he signed with BV Veendam, scoring 12 goals in 50 league matches in three years.

In 2009, he signed with Helmond Sport, where his brother Jeroen had just signed a loan deal. He signed a contract keeping him in Helmond until 2011. Veldmate made his debut for Helmond Sport in a league win (4–0) against Fortuna Sittard on 7 August 2009. On 31 May 2011, he signed with Sparta Rotterdam together with his brother, Jeroen, for two years.

As part of amateur club VV Staphorst, he announced his retirement from football in 2019.

References

External links
 Voetbal International profile 
 

1984 births
Living people
Dutch footballers
Footballers from Groningen (city)
FC Groningen players
FC Emmen players
SC Veendam players
Helmond Sport players
Sparta Rotterdam players
MVV Maastricht players
HHC Hardenberg players
Eredivisie players
Eerste Divisie players
Derde Divisie players
Vierde Divisie players
Association football midfielders